was a Japanese jazz singer and actress.

Early life and career
Shizuko Kasagi was born  on 25 August 1914 in Ōkawa District, Kagawa, Japan.

Before World War II, Shizuko was one of the stars of the Japan Girls Opera Company. During the Occupation of Japan, she became a mega star singing songs influenced by American jazz and boogie woogie. She appeared in the 1948 film Drunken Angel directed by Akira Kurosawa. In 1955, Shizuko retired from singing and concentrated on her acting career.

Death
Kasagi died from ovarian cancer on 30 March 1985, aged 70.

Films
 Drunken Angel (1948)
 Hateshinaki Jonetsu (1949)
 Ginza Kankan Musume (1949)
 Endless Desire (1958)
 Sukurappu Shūdan (1968)
 Gendai Yakuza: Shinjuku no Yotamono (1970)
 Zubekō Banchō: Zange no Neuchi mo Nai (1971)
 Kigeki: Onna Ikitemasu (1971)

References

External links

 
 

1914 births
1985 deaths
Japanese women jazz singers
Japanese film actresses
Actors from Kagawa Prefecture
Deaths from ovarian cancer
Nippon Columbia artists
20th-century Japanese actresses
Deaths from cancer in Japan
Musicians from Kagawa Prefecture
20th-century Japanese women singers
20th-century Japanese singers